FRY like transcription coactivator is a protein that in humans is encoded by the FRYL gene.

References

Further reading